Laurent Naouri, Chevalier L.H. (born May 23, 1964) is a French bass-baritone.  Initially beginning his education at the École Centrale de Lyon, Naouri decided to concentrate on opera in 1986 and continued his musical studies at the Guildhall School of Music and Drama in London.

Naouri was born in Paris.  His professional career in France began in 1992 with performances in the title role of Darius Milhaud’s Christophe Colomb (Christopher Columbus) for the opening of the Imperial Theatre in Compiègne. Progressing rapidly, his career quickly comprised a very varied repertoire ranging from Monteverdi to contemporary composers  under such conductors as Maurizio Benini, William Christie, René Jacobs, Marc Minkowski, and Kent Nagano.

Naouri made his debut at the Opéra Garnier in the role of Thésée in Rameau's  Hippolyte et Aricie, followed by Eugene Onegin at the Opéra de Nancy, interpreting at the Opéra Bastille the roles of the Comte Des Grieux in Massenet's Manon and Figaro in The Marriage of Figaro.  A wide range of roles has followed, including many from the Baroque era including Rameau's Platée and Les Indes galantes and Handel's Alcina.

In Britain, he has appeared at the Royal Opera House in 2006 in the role of Escamillo in Carmen; in the United States at the Santa Fe Opera he appeared in the same role in the 2006 Carmen . Also at the Santa Fe Opera, he is scheduled for the role of Falstaff in Verdi's opera of the same name for June/July 2008 and as Germont in the 2009 La traviata starring his wife as Violetta.

Naouri is married to soprano Natalie Dessay, and they have two children.

Selected recordings
Hector Berlioz, Benvenuto Cellini, Gregory Kunde, Benvenuto Cellini, Patrizia Ciofi, Teresa, Laurent Naouri, Balducci, Joyce DiDonato, Ascanio, Jean-François Lapointe, Fieramosca, Renaud Délègue, Le Pape Clément VII, Choeur de Radio France, Orchestre National de France, conducted by John Nelson, 3 CD Erato Warner classics 2004

References

External links
Laurent Naouri Operabase

1964 births
Chevaliers of the Légion d'honneur
Living people
Operatic bass-baritones
École Centrale de Lyon alumni
20th-century French male opera singers
21st-century French male opera singers